Kožešník (feminine: Kožešníková) is a Czech-language occupational surname literally meaning "furrier". Notable people with the surname include:

Jaroslav Kožešník, Czechoslovak academician
Zdenek Kozesnik, Czechoslovak national badminton champion

Czech-language surnames
Occupational surnames